Kensuke (written: 健介, 健輔, 謙介, 謙佑, 建介, 賢介, 賢輔 or 賢典) is a masculine Japanese given name. Notable people with the name include:

, Japanese footballer
, Japanese photographer
, Japanese rugby union player and coach
, Japanese footballer
, Japanese photographer
, Japanese musician
, Japanese shogi player
Kensuke Kobayashi (born 1986), Japanese cricketer
, Japanese artist
, Japanese professional baseball player
, Japanese physician
, Japanese footballer
, Japanese figure skater
, Japanese footballer
, Japanese professional wrestler
, Japanese footballer
Kensuke Shiina, Japanese DJ and musician
, Japanese long-distance runner
, Japanese video game designer and producer
, Japanese baseball player
, Japanese footballer
, Japanese baseball player
Kensuke Ushio (born 1983), Japanese musician and composer, notably of the scoreboard for the movie A Silent Voice

Japanese masculine given names